Typhonia beatricis is a moth of the Psychidae family. It is found in Switzerland, where it is thought to be an introduced species. The species is possible endemic to the eastern Mediterranean region.

References

Moths described in 2000
Typhonia